Lokomotiv Sofia is a sports club from Sofia, Bulgaria, founded in 1929. Its football team, PFC Lokomotiv Sofia, is its most renowned sports branch.

 
Multi-sport clubs in Bulgaria

References